Ingvardt Hansen was a Danish gymnast. He competed in the men's team event at the 1908 Summer Olympics.

References

External links

Year of birth missing
Year of death missing
Danish male artistic gymnasts
Olympic gymnasts of Denmark
Gymnasts at the 1908 Summer Olympics
Place of birth missing